Joselito "José" Canó Soriano (born March 7, 1962) is a Dominican former professional baseball pitcher who briefly pitched in Major League Baseball (MLB) for the Houston Astros in .

Career
Canó pitched six games with the Houston Astros and was the only major league pitcher to record a  complete game in his final major league appearance (which was his only win).

Canó played on the Uni-President Lions from 1992 to 1994 and the Wei Chuan Dragons from 1998 to 1999 in Taiwan.

Personal life
His son, Robinson Canó, whom he named after Jackie Robinson, is an MLB second baseman. Canó pitched to both his son and to David Ortiz in the 2011 Major League Baseball Home Run Derby, won by his son. He also pitched to Los Angeles Dodgers outfielder Yasiel Puig in the 2014 Major League Baseball Home Run Derby.

References

External links

1962 births
Living people
Anderson Braves players
Columbus Mudcats players
Dominican Republic baseball coaches
Dominican Republic expatriate baseball players in Taiwan
Dominican Republic expatriate baseball players in the United States
Dominican Republic national baseball team people
Durham Bulls players
Gulf Coast Yankees players
Houston Astros players

Major League Baseball pitchers
Major League Baseball players from the Dominican Republic
Osceola Astros players
People from San Pedro de Macorís Province
Tucson Toros players
Uni-President Lions players
Wei Chuan Dragons players